The 1992 United States presidential election in Ohio took place on November 3, 1992, as part of the 1992 United States presidential election. Voters chose 21 representatives, or electors to the Electoral College, who voted for president and vice president.

Ohio was won by Governor Bill Clinton (D-Arkansas) with 40.18% of the popular vote over incumbent President George H. W. Bush (R-Texas) with 38.35%. Businessman Ross Perot (I-Texas) finished in third, with 20.98% of the popular vote. Governor Clinton thus defeated President Bush for Ohio’s 21 Electoral Votes, by a statewide vote margin of 1.83% Clinton ultimately won the national vote, defeating incumbent President Bush. , this is the last election in which Coshocton County voted for a Democratic presidential candidate, the last in which Franklin County voted for a Republican presidential candidate and the last until 2020 in which Sandusky County voted for a losing candidate.

States just as close as Ohio that were called for Clinton as soon as their polls closed, such as Georgia, New Jersey, and Colorado, was why Ohio was the state that put Clinton over the top according to news networks, albeit Tennessee was the tipping point state. This was also the only time since 1944 that Ohio did not vote the same way as Florida, a bellwether state just like Ohio.

Clinton's strongest performance was in the southeast of the state near the border with West Virginia. He also gained solid majorities in the industrial regions focused on Youngstown, Akron, and Cleveland. Bush performed best in the rural western agricultural counties as did Perot. Perot received the second-highest share of the vote in three of these counties (Mercer, Shelby, and Williams) and he beat Bush in one county won by Clinton (Trumbull).

Results

Results by county

See also
 United States presidential elections in Ohio
 Presidency of Bill Clinton

Notes

References

Ohio
1992
1992 Ohio elections